Jake Michael Carder (born 11 December 1995) is an Australian cricketer. He made his first-class debut for Cricket Australia XI against the West Indians during their tour of Australia in December 2015. He made his List A debut for Cricket Australia XI in the 2016–17 Matador BBQs One-Day Cup on 1 October 2016.

Domestic career
Carder was in the Cricket Australia XI squad for the 2017–18 JLT One-Day Cup. Batting second against South Australia, he scored his maiden List A century. He scored 102 and combined with Beau Webster for a 229-run partnership, the fourth-highest second-wicket partnership in Australia's domestic one-day history. This helped deliver Cricket Australia XI just the second victory in their history. He played every match for Cricket Australia XI and finished the tournament as one of their best batsmen, scoring 200 runs at an average of 33.33.

In September 2021, in the opening match of the 2021–22 Sheffield Shield season, Carder scored his maiden century in first-class cricket, with 118 runs. He made his Twenty20 debut on 26 January 2022, for the Sydney Sixers in the 2021–22 Big Bash League season.

References

External links
 

1995 births
Living people
Australian cricketers
Cricket Australia XI cricketers
Cricketers from Perth, Western Australia
South Australia cricketers
Western Australia cricketers
Sydney Sixers cricketers